

This is a detailed table of the National Register of Historic Places listing in Oglala Lakota County, South Dakota.

This is intended to be a detailed table of the property on the National Register of Historic Places in Oglala Lakota County, South Dakota, United States.  Latitude and longitude coordinates are provided for this property; they may be seen in a Google map.

There is 1 property listed on the National Register in the county.  It is a National Historic Landmark.

Current listing

|}

References

 
Oglala Lakota